Banque Nationale Agricole (BNA) is a state-controlled bank in Tunisia. It is listed in the Bourse de Tunis.

History
The Banque Nationale Agricole was created on 1 June 1959, and launched by President Habib Bourguiba on 10 October 1959. In 1969, it changed its name to Banque Nationale de Tunisie. On 24 June 1989, it merged with the Banque Nationale de Développement Agricole and was renamed Banque Nationale Agricole.

It is the main bank in rural Tunisia.

External links

References

Banks established in 1959
Banks of Tunisia
1959 establishments in Tunisia
Companies listed on the Bourse de Tunis
Government-owned companies of Tunisia
Government-owned banks